The 1976–77 Norwegian 1. Divisjon season was the 38th season of ice hockey in Norway. Ten teams participated in the league, and Manglerud Star won the championship.

First round

Second round

Final round

Relegation round

External links 
 Norwegian Ice Hockey Federation

Nor
GET-ligaen seasons
1976 in Norwegian sport
1977 in Norwegian sport